Jean-Baptiste Pallegoix, M.E.P. (24 October 1805 – 18 June 1862) was vicar apostolic of Eastern Siam.

Born in Combertault, France, he was consecrated as a priest of the Société des Missions Etrangères on 31 May 1828. On 3 June 1838 he was assigned as Coadjutor Vicar Apostolic of Siam and titular bishop of Mallus. He was consecrated the same day by Bishop Jean-Paul-Hilaire-Michel Courvezy, the vicar apostolic of Siam. On 10 September 1841 he succeeded Courvezy and became vicar apostolic of Eastern Siam.

Bishop Pallegoix was highly esteemed by King Mongkut and they often discussed issues. The king personally assisted at Pallegoix's funeral.

Writings 
 Description du Royaume Thai

 Dictionarium linguae Thaĭ sive Sa̱mensis interpretatione Latina, Gallica et Anglica illustratum; Paris 1854, Reprint: Farnborough 1972.

 Siamese French English Dictionary; Bangkok 1898.

References

External links
 catholic-hierarchy.org

1805 births
1862 deaths
People from Côte-d'Or
Apostolic vicars of Siam
Paris Foreign Missions Society missionaries
French expatriates in Thailand
Roman Catholic missionaries in Thailand
Paris Foreign Missions Society bishops